The Kereu River is a river of New Zealand's northeastern North Island. It flows northwest from its headwaters, the largest of which ios the Hauhauponamu Stream, reaching the sea in the extreme east of the Bay of Plenty, close to the township of Te Kaha.

See also
List of rivers of New Zealand

References

Rivers of the Gisborne District
Rivers of New Zealand
Rivers of the Bay of Plenty Region